Home for Christmas is a 2010 Norwegian comedy-drama film directed by Bent Hamer.

“Home for Christmas” is based on a selection of short stories from the Norwegian author Levi Henriksen's collection, ”Only Soft Presents Under the Tree”. These stories, which now and then intersect with each other, all take place in Henriksen's fictitious small town of Skogli, over a couple of hours on Christmas Eve.

Storyline 
Following a prologue set in war-torn former Yugoslavia, the film follows several different Christmas celebrations in the small Norwegian town of Skogli. Paul is a thirty-three-year-old laborer who marches into his doctor's office demanding a prescription, then proceeds to lay bare all his woes. The doctor is beleaguered by his own marital and financial difficulties (he's left his upset wife to work emergency calls on Christmas Eve). There's also an elderly man preparing an esoteric ritual, a vagrant who runs into an old flame, a middle-aged couple in the throes of passion, a boy hopelessly in love with his Muslim neighbor, and a young émigré couple whose car breaks down as the woman goes into labor.

Cast
 Nina Andresen Borud as Karin
 Arianit Berisha as Goran
 Joachim Calmeyer as Simon
 Trond Fausa as Paul
 Levi Henriksen
 Cecile Mosli as Elise
 Igor Necemer as Serb
 Tomas Norström as Kristen
 Kai Remlov
 Morten Ilseng Risnes as Thomas
 Sarah Bintu Sakor as Bintu
 Isaka Sawadogo as Bintu's father
 Kristine Rui Slettebakken as Tone
 Nadja Soukup as Goran's mother
 Kyrre Haugen Sydness as Hroar
 Fridtjov Såheim as Knut
 Reidar Sørensen as Jordan
 Nina Zanjani as Albanian woman
 Ingunn Beate Øyen as Johanne Jakobsen

Soundtracks

Music  

by John Erik Kaada

Silent Night (in thai language) 

sung by Songsit Ohm Lertsethtakarn - lyrical tenor

text in thai language by Songsit Ohm Lertsethtakarn

Home for Christmas (in English) 

written and sung by Maria Mena

Award

Amanda Awards, Norway 2011

RiverRun International Film Festival 2011

See also
 List of Christmas films

References

External links
 

2010 films
2010s Norwegian-language films
Films directed by Bent Hamer
Films scored by John Erik Kaada
Norwegian Christmas films
2010s Christmas comedy-drama films
Norwegian comedy-drama films